Lassaad Jarda Chabbi (born 23 August 1961) is a Tunisian football manager. He is the manager of Difaa El Jadida. In 2018 he had a passage at SV Ried.

Personal
Chabbi is the father of professional football players Seifedin Chabbi and Nino Chabbi.

Manager career
For his first season as manager of US Monastir , the team finished the season in the third place and won the national cup on September 27, 2020

Honours
Managerial honours :

 US Monastir 
 Tunisian Cup: 2020

 Raja Casablanca 

 CAF Confederation Cup: 2021
 Arab Club Champions Cup: 2020 Notes''':
  Suspended in 2020 and resumed in 2021.

References

External links
 

1961 births
Living people
SC Austria Lustenau managers
SV Ried managers
Lassaad Chabbi
Expatriate football managers in Austria
Expatriate football managers in Thailand
Tunisian football managers
Tunisian expatriate football managers
Sportspeople from Tunis
Raja CA managers
Botola managers
Étoile Sportive du Sahel managers